Seongsu Station is a rapid transit station on Seoul Subway Line 2. It is located in Seongsu-dong in the Seongdong-gu administrative district of Seoul. It is also the southeastern terminus of Line 2's Seongsu Branch to Sinseol-dong. Trains needing to be serviced take the Seongsu Branch from this station and go to the Gunja Train Depot behind Yongdap Station.

The platform is elevated and features 4 tracks. The main circle route of Line 2 runs on the inside pair of tracks while the Sinseol-dong branch is served by the outside pair of tracks. The station has four exits and is connected to two bus routes as well as a local shuttle bus which services the various apartment complexes in the area around the station. The stations services Seongsu 1ga 1 dong, Seongsu 2ga 1 dong, and Seongsu 2ga 3 dong. The area around the station is primarily commercial and light industrial but gives way to mixed-use development and residential further from station. Exits 1 and 2 service a nearby Lotte Castle apartment complex.

History
The station is part of the original set of stations which made up the first phase of Line 2. It was built on October 31, 1980, at the intersection of Guui Road (구의로) and Seong-Sam Road (성삼길). The initial section of Line 2 ran from Sinseol-dong to the Sports Complex in Jamsil-dong. In 1983 Seongsu Station was split as the Line 2 circle was extended by nine stations to Euljiro 1(il)-ga. The Sinseol-dong line became known as a branch line at this time. It would be another eight months before the circle line was completed in May 1984.

Facilities
The station is an elevated platform with 2 islands. The exits on the station are paired at either end of the station. They are not separated by ticket gates which allows passengers and pedestrians to walk the full length of the station. The station features several small shops, including convenience stores, clothing shops, and other variety stores. There are washroom facilities in the middle of the main concourse.

One block from exits 1 and 2 is the Seongsu Lotte Castle luxury apartment complex. This complex contains several residential apartment towers, as well as small shops and park facilities for children and residents. Past the Lotte Castle is a riverfront park area which is situated on a small branch of the Han River the branch runs east briefly and then turns north at Hwayang-dong.

Within 200 meters from all exits there are several small community parks including Seongsu Green Park and Hyanglim Park.

Exits 3 and 4 service mainly mixed-use residential and commercial buildings as well as the Seongsu E-mart which is adjacent to the Seongsu 2ga 1 dong resident center.

Station layout

Service
The Line 2 circle route and Seongsu Branch Line are both operated by Seoul Metro at this station. They are serviced through the same pair of island platforms. The subway runs with varying headways depending on the time of day. During rush hour it can come as often as every 3 minutes and in non-peak times it can be as infrequent as every 18 minutes. It takes an equal amount of time in either direction to reach Sindaebang Station on Line 2 from Seongsu Station making it the mid-way point on the opposite side of the loop.

Passengers can transfer directly between a branch line and circle route train if they arrive on the same platform or they can take the stairs down and transfer to the other platform if required without leaving the ticket gates.

Only exits 1, 3, and 4 are connected to the two bus routes which service the station. Passengers can transfer to either the Green Line 2224, which goes to Guui-dong or 2413 which runs service to Gaepo-dong. The local shuttle bus runs a small route around Seongsu to deliver passengers to various residential areas.

Average daily ridership

References

Seoul Metropolitan Subway stations
Metro stations in Seongdong District
Railway stations opened in 1980
1980 establishments in South Korea
20th-century architecture in South Korea